are a style of baggy sock worn by Japanese high school girls, as part of  culture. This style of socks has also become popular among American teens and college students who are fans of Japanese anime and manga. These socks come in a variety of styles, defined by the knitting pattern of the upper portion of the sock. The two most popular styles are the traditional 2×2 rib knit (pictured) and tube-style loose socks, which are thigh-high length tube socks worn pushed down around the ankles. A skin-safe body adhesive popularly known as "sock glue" can be used to affix the uppermost part of the sock to the calf so that the entire sock will not bunch downward and spoil the look.

Loose socks were adopted as a fashion which flattered plump calves and also expressed rebellious deviation from Japan's strict dress code for school uniforms. They have been used as an inspiration for photography by Akira Gomi.

See also 

 
 Sagging (fashion)

References 

socks
Japanese fashion
Japanese clothing
Japanese culture
1990s fashion